The Zion Lutheran Cemetery, Wrought-Iron Cross Site, near Mercer, North Dakota, United States, was listed on the National Register of Historic Places in 1989.  It includes wrought-iron crosses.  The listing included seven contributing objects.

It includes work by Carl Rennich, of Mercer.  Rennich was one of a number of "German-Russian blacksmiths in central North Dakota" who developed individual styles in their crosses and whose "work was known for miles around them."

References

External links

Cemeteries on the National Register of Historic Places in North Dakota
German-Russian culture in North Dakota
National Register of Historic Places in McLean County, North Dakota
Lutheran cemeteries in the United States